The Zimbabwe Unity Movement, was a short lived political movement in Zimbabwe. It served as a successor and link to the Conservative Alliance of Zimbabwe. Edgar Tekere ran as Presidential Candidate in the 1990 Zimbabwean Presidential election, against Robert Mugabe.

History
Tekere supported Mugabe at the 1985 elections but by October 1988 his consistent criticism of corruption resulted in his expulsion from the party. When Mugabe voiced his belief that Zimbabwe would be better governed as a one-party state, Tekere strongly disagreed, saying "A one-party state was never one of the founding principles of ZANU-PF and experience in Africa has shown that it brought the evils of nepotism, corruption and inefficiency."

He ran against Robert Mugabe in the 1990 Presidential race as the candidate of the Zimbabwe Unity Movement, offering a broadly free market platform against Mugabe's centralised economic planning. Edgar Tekere received unprecedented support for his opposition to Mugabe which led to massive election rigging by ZANU in order for Mugabe to win the election on 1 April 1990 receiving 2,026,976 votes while Tekere only got 413,840 (16% of the vote). At the simultaneous Parliamentary elections the ZUM won 20% of the vote but only two seats in the House of Assembly. Zimbabwe Unity Movement supporters were the targets of violent attacks from supporters of ZANU (PF) and five candidates were murdered. A student representative Israel Mutanhaurwa of ZUM was abducted in broad daylight by suspected state agents at the local cinemas in Gweru to be dumped unharmed on the outskirts of Mkoba a local suburb. No-one was arrested or convicted of the crime. Those convicted of the attempted murder of former Gweru Mayor Patrick Kombayi who was shot in lower abdomen but survived the shooting, were pardoned immediately afterwards .

Defunct political parties in Zimbabwe